Dawson ISD - Dawson, TX is a public school district based in Dawson, Texas (USA). Dawson ISD serves southwestern Navarro County, including the unincorporated community of Purdon. An extremely small portion of the district extends into neighboring Hill County.

Dawson ISD has one school with 2 campuses - Dawson Junior / Senior High School (Dawson, Texas) and Dawson Elementary School (Dawson, Texas).

The district is administered by a superintendent and administrative staff located in the central administration offices.  Policy decisions and administrative suggestions are made by the Board of Trustees, who are elected by the community.

Dawson School Song

We Are Dawson High School.

That Is Our Name.

Never, Oh, Never.

Will She Lose Her Fame.

We Love Her.

So, We Say Forever.

Loyal Are We.

For We Are Bound Together

Through Eternity.

Quick Facts

The district has:

510 students 
42 teachers 
1 elementary 
1 junior high school 
1 high school

Approximately 9 Students to every 1 Teacher.

Sports and Activities
Dawson ISD excels in numerous activities. Sports that Dawson HS and JH participate in are Girls Volleyball (V, JV, JH), Football (V, JH), Cross Country (HS and JH), Basketball (B and G V, JV, and JH), Baseball (Varsity), Softball (Varsity), Powerlifting (HS), Tennis (HS, V), Golf (HS), and Track (HS and JH), Wrestling (HS). Extra-Curricular activities include Band (HS and JH), Cheerleading (HS and JH), Yearbook (HS), FCA (HS and JH), FFA (HS), One Act Play (HS and JH), and National Honor Society (JH and HS).

Key -
V - Varsity
JV - Junior Varsity
JH - Junior High
HS - High School
B - Boys
G - Girls

Contact information
Dawson ISD is located at 199 North School Ave. in Dawson, Texas 76639. The phone number for the District is 254.578.1031.

References

External links

School districts in Navarro County, Texas
School districts in Hill County, Texas
School districts established in 1928
1928 establishments in Texas